is a high-end Japanese wheel manufacturer for both motorsport and street use. Their flagship brand, Volk Racing wheels, features a high-tech forging process exclusive to Rays Engineering.

They are the current wheel suppliers to winning factory race teams of Nissan, Honda, Toyota, and Mazda in racing series such as Super GT, Japanese Touring Car Championship (JTCC), British Touring Car Championship (BTCC), Formula Nippon, Formula D and Formula One. Their Volk Racing wheels are popular with owners of sport compact and import cars on the race and show circuits.

Rays Engineering also manufactures wheels for car manufacturers' in-house tuning teams such as Nismo, Ralliart, STi, Mazdaspeed and Toyota Racing Development and also supply wheels to Williams Formula One team as well as the cars of The Fast and the Furious: Tokyo Drift.

History
RAYS was founded in 1973. The company opened a Tokyo sales office in 1980.

In 1981, RAYS established their Racing Division, and the following year, the company opened their Two-Wheel Vehicle Division. In 1984, RAYS Engineering built a new plant in Yao.

In 1986, the company brought in their first 5,500-ton forging press. They later purchased 2 3,500 presses, and in 2004, installed a 10,000-ton forging machine.

In 2007, Rays began supplying wheels to the William F1 team.

Wheel construction
Rays Engineering wheels are manufactured through two different processes: forging and casting. After each wheel is manufactured, the wheel goes through strenuous inspection before being packaged and shipped out. The following is a video showing each manufacturing process of a Rays Engineering wheel: Rays Engineering Manufacturing Process.

Forging
The forging process for a Rays Wheel consists of seven steps:
 Hot Forging – Takes a billet and creates metal lines through volume distribution with a hot press.
 RM Forging – Forging method exclusively developed Rays Engineering. Finishing of designed parts on the wheel is completed during this process.
 Cold Spinning – Width of wheel is constructed during this process with a high-speed spinning machine.
 Heat Treatment – Wheel is quickly heated then immediately cooled down with a solution to form a strong structure for the wheel.
 Machine Work – Special cutting device used to improve roundness of the wheel.
 Shot Blast – This process smooths the surface of the wheel to prepare of aesthetic finishing.
 Surface Finishing – Various chemicals are used to prevent corrosion and protect the surface of the wheel

Types of forged wheels
Forged 1 Piece Magnesium
Forged 1 Piece Aluminum
Forged (Seamless) Rim 2 Piece Wheel Aluminum

Casting
The casting process for a Rays Wheel consists of four steps:
 Fusion – Aluminum metal is heated up into molten liquid.
 Molten Metal Treating – Process of removing impurities from molten aluminum. Molten aluminum with no impurities are moved into a holding furnace.
 Casting – Molten aluminum is poured into a die to form the wheel.
 Machine Work – Various chemicals are used to prevent corrosion and protect the surface of the wheel

Types of cast wheels
Cast 1 Piece Aluminum
RCF (Rays Cast Flow Forming) Casting 1 Piece Aluminum

Product lineup
Volk Racing – Flagship forged sport wheels brand name of Rays Engineering.
Gram Lights – Lightweight wheels manufactured through casting process.
Eco Drive Gear – Lightweight wheels focused on being eco friendly.
57 Motor Sport – Cast racing wheels used in World Touring Car Championship and British Touring Car Championship.
Versus – Fashion brand of wheels with influences from European styling.
G-Games – Wheels used in the JDM scene with influences from American styling.
Daytona – Performance wheels produced for Japanese Kei car. 
Black Fleet – Japan's dress-up culture for the sedan scene brings the newest design with a tuner taste.
Garcia – Wheels bringing in the latest design trends for vans and Kei car.
A/X RePLA/Y – The Arthur Exchange brand is revamped from 2010 with fresh new design wheels.
Vesta
Sebring – also the Japanese distributor for its exhaust pipes

References

External links

 RAYS Global site 

Automotive companies of Japan
Wheel manufacturers
Automotive motorsports and performance companies
Auto parts suppliers of Japan
Manufacturing companies based in Osaka
Manufacturing companies established in 1973
1973 establishments in Japan
Automotive accessories
Japanese brands